Arbenita Curraj (born 28 July 1996) is a Kosovan-born Albanian footballer who plays as a midfielder and has appeared for the Albania women's national team.

Career
Curraj has been capped for the Albania national team, appearing for the team during the 2019 FIFA Women's World Cup qualifying cycle.

International goals

See also
List of Albania women's international footballers

References

External links
 
 
 

1996 births
Living people
Albanian women's footballers
Women's association football midfielders
Albania women's international footballers
People from Suva Reka
Kosovan women's footballers
KFF Hajvalia players
Kosovan people of Albanian descent
Sportspeople of Albanian descent